JK Tabasalu is a football club based in Tabasalu, Estonia. The club competes in Esiliiga, the second tier of Estonian football. Tabasalu's home ground is Tabasalu Arena.

History
The football club was created on 23 November 2012 and its first seasons in the Estonian league system were quite successful: they finished second in their debut seasons in IV liiga and III liiga. Even in the fourth division they finished constantly in the upper part of the table. In 2018, they hired former FCI Levadia coach Marko Kristal and quickly became II liiga's title contenders.

The year ended with them finishing third, but due to Paide Linnameeskond III not wanting to get promoted, they were given the opportunity to take part in promotion play-offs. They got through to the final thanks to FCI Tallinn using an unavailable player.  In the final round they played against Lasnamäe Ajax, who they managed to beat 3:0 and 4:1 and were therefore promoted to the top three leagues.

In their debut season in Esiliiga B, they were last-placed after 17 rounds, but they managed to start gaining points and at the end of the year they were seventh and nine points ahead of relegation places. After the season, Marko Kristal joined Nõmme Kalju.  The following year was went even better as in the Estonian Cup they reached the quarter-finals and in the league they finished fourth. They were again given the option to play in the promotion play-offs, but this time they lost 1:3 and 1:5 to Pärnu JK.

Tabasalu JK is well known for their large fanbase and great youth teams. In 2018, when they were still in II liiga, they had an average attendance of 321 people, which was Estonia's fourth largest home average. Their youth players have had trials in Bologna, Chievo Verona and Padova.

Tabasalu finished the 2022 Esiliiga B season in 2nd place, narrowly losing the title in the last second of the final matchday against FC Tallinn. On 19 October 2022, Tabasalu notably knocked out Estonian top-flight club Nõmme Kalju FC from the Estonian Cup by winning 1–0.

Players

Current squad
 ''As of 17 June 2019.

Out on loan

League and Cup history

References

Harju County
Football clubs in Estonia
Association football clubs established in 2012
2012 establishments in Estonia